The Emanuel D. Adler House is a historic 1888 residence built in Milwaukee, Wisconsin in 1888. It was designed by Milkwaukee architect Alfred Charles Clas. Clas partnered with George Bowman Ferry in 1890 and they formed Ferry & Clas. The partnership continued until Ferry's death.

History
Emanuel D. Adler was a successful manufacturer of clothing. The house was added to the State and the National Register of Historic Places in 1991.

References

Houses on the National Register of Historic Places in Wisconsin
National Register of Historic Places in Milwaukee
Houses in Milwaukee
Queen Anne architecture in Wisconsin
Romanesque Revival architecture in Wisconsin
Brick buildings and structures
Limestone buildings in the United States